CFBS-FM is a community radio station that operates at 89.9 FM in Blanc-Sablon, Quebec, Canada. Owned by Radio Blanc-Sablon, the station was licensed in 1986.

The station is a member of the Association des radiodiffuseurs communautaires du Québec.

Rebroadcasters
The station also operates on the following transmitters:

References

External links
cfbsradio.net
 

Fbs
Fbs
Radio stations established in 1986
1986 establishments in Quebec